Verkhny Balykley is a rural locality (a selo) and the administrative center of Verkhnebalykleyskoye Rural Settlement, Bykovsky District, Volgograd Oblast, Russia. The population was 1,730 as of 2010. There are 22 streets.

Geography 
Verkhny Balykley is located in Zavolzhye, 35 km south of Bykovo (the district's administrative centre) by road. Nizhny Balykley is the nearest rural locality.

References 

Rural localities in Bykovsky District